Samson and Delilah is a 1620 painting by Anthony van Dyck.It was heavily inspired by his tutor Rubens's version of the same subject and for a long time was attributed to Rubens. Van Dyck inverted the composition and showed Delilah in white chalk make-up and heavily rouged cheeks, the makeup traditionally worn by Parisian prostitutes. The painting is now held in the Dulwich Picture Gallery in London. He returned to the subject in 1630.

References

Bibliography
Beatrice Marshall, Old Blackfriars: A Story of the Days of Anthony Van Dyck (1901), Kessinger Publishing, 2009

1620 paintings
Religious paintings by Anthony van Dyck
Paintings in the Dulwich Picture Gallery
van Dyck